Marine Fighting Squadron 215 (VMF-215) was a fighter squadron of the United States Marine Corps that was commissioned and fought during World War II. Known as "The Fighting Corsairs", the squadron fought in many areas of the Pacific War, including the Battle of Bougainville. During its four-and-a-half month tour, the squadron was credited with shooting down 137 enemy aircraft, fourth most in Marine Corps aviation history.

Following the surrender of Japan, the squadron was decommissioned on November 13, 1946. The squadron was reactivated in the Marine Forces Reserve and based out of Naval Air Station Olathe, Kansas until being decommissioned again on January 30, 1970.

History

World War II

The squadron was commissioned on March 1, 1942, as Marine Scout Bomber Squadron 244 (VMSB-244).  On September 14 of that same year they were re-designated Marine Scout Bomber Squadron 242 (VMSB-242) only to be changed again the next day to its final name, Marine Fighting Squadron 215. The squadron trained at Marine Corps Air Station Santa Barbara, California prior to deploying and during this time transitioned from the SBD Dauntless dive bomber to the F4F Wildcat.

The squadron departed the United States on February 23, 1943, and was first sent to Marine Corps Air Station Ewa, Hawaii. During their time at MCAS Ewa they again transitioned aircraft, this time receiving the F4U Corsair. The squadron departed Hawaii on May 12 for Midway Atoll where they stayed for two months flying combat air patrols and escorting Allied shipping in the area. In mid-June 1943 they left Midway for the South Pacific.

VMF-215 arrived on Espiritu Santo on July 1, 1943, and by the end of the month was taking part in fighter sweeps against Japanese bases in the northern Solomon Islands. On August 14, an F4U Corsair from VMF-215 was the first plane to arrive at the newly captured Munda airfield where they immediately began operating to cover the landings on Vella Lavella. Shortly thereafter the squadron pulled back to the rear for rest and relaxation.

The squadron’s second combat tour began while they were based at Barakoma Airfield on Vella Lavella. From there they covered the landings at Empress Augusta Bay on Bougainville, which began on November 1, 1943. By January 27, 1944 the squadron was operating from Torokina Airfield on Bougainville and from there the squadron took part in air strikes against the Japanese garrison at Rabaul, the Japanese naval base at Kavieng, New Ireland and against Japanese shipping near the Bismarck Archipelago.  During this time VMF-215 established four new Marine records in the South Pacific by downing 137 Japanese planes in 18 weeks, 87 planes shot down in one month, 106 planes destroyed in a single 6-week tour and 10 aces in one squadron.

As action in the Solomons drew to a close the squadron was sent to Turtle Bay Airfield where it was not deactivated but existed only on paper for a few weeks. They were reformed on May 7, 1944, and were sent to Emirau on August 5, 1944. From there they moved to Guadalcanal on their way back to the United States where they eventually arrived on October 20, 1944. Upon arrival at Marine Corps Air Station El Toro, California, the unit was decommissioned on November 6; however, they were reactivated again on November 21 and became a carrier training replacement unit.  Following the end of World War II, the squadron was decommissioned on November 13, 1945.

Reserve years

VMF-215 was reactivated as squadron in the Marine Forces Reserve on July 1, 1946 at Naval Air Station Olathe in Kansas. The squadron flew the F9F-6 Cougar and later the F9F-8/8Bs. In 1962 it transitioned to the Douglas F4D Skyray.  In April 1965, VMF-215 transitioned for the last time to the  F-8A Crusader.  The squadron was never recalled to active duty and was decommissioned for the last time on January 30, 1970.

Notable former members
 Robert M. Hanson – 25 kills and Medal of Honor recipient
 Donald N. Aldrich – 20 kills
 Harold L. Spears – 15 kills
Robert G. Owens Jr. – 7 kills, 5 probables
 A. Roger Conant – 6 kills, 3 probables
 Harold A. "Hap" Langstaff Jr. – 3 kills

Unit awards
A unit citation or commendation is an award bestowed upon an organization for the action cited. Members of the unit who participated in said actions are allowed to wear on their uniforms the awarded unit citation. VMF-215 was presented with the following awards:

See also

 United States Marine Corps Aviation
 List of active United States Marine Corps aircraft squadrons
 List of decommissioned United States Marine Corps aircraft squadrons

Notes

References
Bibliography

 
 

 
 
 
 

Web

 VMF-215 squadron history

External links
 Information of a wrecked VMF-215 F4u Corsair that has been located
 Images of Capt. Conant and his F4U
 http://www.pacificwrecks.com/aircraft/f4u/56260.html Information on lost F4U Corsair on 3 Sept 1944. Pilot 2nd Lt Arthur Patet, USMCR. Aircraft and pilot never found after crash at Lassuk Bay, New Ireland, PNG
 Information from USMC Archives and JPAC. (R.A. Clark, USMC)

Fighting215
Inactive units of the United States Marine Corps